Sneathia amnii is a bacterium from the genus of Sneathia which has been isolated from human blood from Strasbourg in France. Sneathia amnii is a pathogen of the female urogenital tract.

References

Fusobacteriota
Bacteria described in 2002